Beryllium carbonate is a chemical compound with the chemical formula .

Structures
There are three forms reported, anhydrous, tetrahydrate and basic beryllium carbonate. The anhydrous form is reported to be unstable, decomposing to BeO and carbon dioxide, and requiring storage under .

Preparation
Basic beryllium carbonate is a mixed salt, which can be prepared by the reaction of beryllium sulfate and ammonium carbonate, and  contains both carbonate and hydroxide ions, with  formula . It is believed that in the older literature this is probably what was referred to as beryllium carbonate.

Safety
It may cause irritation. Toxic. It should be handled carefully since several related beryllium compounds are known carcinogens.

Natural occurrence
No formations of purely beryllium carbonate are known to occur naturally. The only Be-rich carbonate mineral currently known is niveolanite.

References

Beryllium compounds
Carbonates